For You is the debut studio album by Indonesian singer Fatin Shidqia, who won the first season of X Factor Indonesia. It was officially released on November 11, 2013 by Sony Music Entertainment. The album was produced by Swedish producer Gustav Efraimsson and Hayden Bell. The album debuted at number one on iTunes Indonesia album charts.

The singles released from the album met considerable success. "Aku Memilih Setia" became the singer's first number-one single, "Dia Dia Dia" peaked at number sixteen on the iTunes Indonesia music charts, and "Cahaya Di Langit Itu" became the original soundtrack for the 2013 movie 99 Cahaya di Langit Eropa. The CD version of the album was only available for purchase through Indonesian KFC stores.

Track listing

Charts and certifications

Weekly charts

Certification

Awards

Release history

References 

2013 debut albums
Fatin Shidqia albums